Roy Blitz (born 23 November 1941) is an Australian former football (soccer) player.

Playing career

Club career
Blitz played in the NSW State League for Prague, Pan Hellenic and Canterbury-Marrickville. His £2,300  transfer in 1965 from Prague to Pan Hellenic was a league record.

International career
Blitz played six matches for Australia between 1965 and 1968.

References

Australian soccer players
1941 births
Living people
Association football forwards
Sydney FC Prague players